This is a list of the tallest buildings in Cardiff that are  in height and above in the capital of Wales. They include buildings ranging from the ornate civic centre to the historic Cardiff Castle and Llandaff Cathedral.

The city's growth is reflected in its growing skyline. As is the case with many British cities, some of Cardiff's skyline comprises 1960s and 1970s residential and commercial tower blocks. However, current development trends for high-rise buildings include upmarket apartments and office space.

Cardiff is the largest city in Wales and has the most tall buildings in the country.

Any proposals to the council for a tall building should "Generally be located within an existing cluster or form part of a proposal to create a new cluster (a cluster can be defined as a group of buildings which form a visual cohesion from more than one viewing point)".

Buildings in Cardiff
This list comprises the tallest current standing buildings.

{| class="wikitable sortable"
|-
! Rank
! Name
! Height (m)
! Height (ft)
! Floors
! Year
! Use
! class=unsortable|Location
! class=unsortable|Source
! class=unsortable|Image
! class=unsortable|Notes
|-
|align="center"| 1
| Bridge Street Exchange
| 85
| 
| 26
| 2018
| Residential and retail units     
| 
| 
|
| Student accommodation 
|-
|align="center"| 2
| Capital Tower
| 80
| 262
| 25
| 1967
| Office and retail units
| 
| 
| 
| Until 2018, the tallest building in Cardiff to the top of the roof (architectural feature). 
|-
|align="center"| 3
| Stadium House
| 78
| 256
| 17
| 1976(Renovated 2002)
| Office
| 
| 
| 
|-
|align="center"| 4
| Zenith
| 75 
| 246
| 26
| 2019
| Residential
| 
| 
| 
| Student accommodation
|-
|align="center"| 5
| Phase 2, Government Buildings, Tŷ Glas
| 73
| 239
| 18
| 1969
| Office
| 
| 
| 
| The former HM Government offices complex in Llanishen, north Cardiff. See also Gleider House, Phase 1, Government Buildings
|-
|align="center"| 6
| Altolusso
| 72
| 236
| 23
| 2005
| Residential
| 
| 
| 
|
|-
|rowspan="2" align="center"| 7
| Tŷ Pont Haearn
| 63
| 207
| 21
| 2005
| Residential
| 
| 
| 
| Student accommodation
|-
| Meridian Gate
| 63
| 207
| 21 
| 2009
| Hotel
|
| 
| 
|
|-
|align="center"| 9
| Tŷ Admiral
| 61
| 203
|14
| 2015
| Office and retail units
|
| 
|
|Not to be confused with Admiral House.Designed by Glenn Howells Architects at a cost of £58 million.
|-
|align="center"| 10
| Holland House
| 60.3
| 
| 15
| 1968(Renovated 2004)
| Hotel
| 
| 
| 
| Converted office block
|-
|align="center"| 11
| Llandaff Cathedral
| 59.40
| 195
|
| 1290
| Cathedral
| 
| 
| 
| In Llandaff, a suburb of north Cardiff. Until 1967, the tallest building in Cardiff to the top of the spire (architectural feature).
|-
|align="center"| 12
| Cardiff City Hall Clock Tower
| 59
| 194
| 
| 1905
| Civic building
| 
| 
|
|
|-
| rowspan="3" align="center"|15
|William Morgan House
|58 (approx)
|190
|12
|2020
|Office
|
|
|
|UK Government Regional Hub and offices of HMRC. Named after the bible translator William Morgan (1545–1604).
|-
|Helmont House
| 58
| 190
| 12
| 1984
| Office / Hotel
|
|
|
|
|- id="Brunel House"
|Brunel House
| 58
| 190
| 16
| 1974
| Office and retail units
| 
| 
| 
| Originally called Great Western House, headquarters for the Western Region of British Rail.
|-
|align="center"| 16
| Admiral House
| 55
| 180
| 16
| 2006 (Renovated)
| Residential
| 
| 
| 
| Not to be confused with Tŷ Admiral
|-
|align="center"| 17
| Landmark Place
| 51
| 167
| 17
| 2004
| Residential and retail units
| 
| 
| 
|
|-
|align="center"| 18
| Cardiff University Tower Building
| 50
| 164
| 12
| –
| University
| 
| 
|
|
|-
|align="center" rowspan="2"|19
| Celestia
| 
| 158
| 
| 2007
| Residential
| 
| 
| 
|
|-
| Southgate House
| 48
| 157
| 13
| 1978
| Office / Retail
| 
| 
| 
| Twin tower office block comprising one block 13 storeys and one block of 11 storeys 
|-
| rowspan="2" align="center"|21
| Loudoun House
| 47
| 154
| 16
| 1964
| Residential
| 
| 
| 
| In Butetown, a district of south Cardiff.
|-
| Nelson House
| 47
| 154
| 16
| 1964
| Residential
| 
| 
| 
| In Butetown.
|-
| rowspan="3" align="center"|23
| ISIS 3D
| 46
| 151
| 15
| 2007
| Residential
| 
| 
| 
|
|-
| McKenzie House
| 46
| 151
| 12
| –
| University
| 
| 
|
| Previously known as NPI House
|-
| Eastgate House
| 46
| 151
| 14
| 1969
| Office
|
| 
| 
|
|-
| rowspan="3" align="center"|26
| The Aspect
| 45
| 148
| 15
| 
| Residential and retail units
| 
| 
| 
| Converted office block
|-
| Century Wharf: Strata
| 45
| 148
| 15
| 2009
| Residential
| 
| 
| 
|
|-
| The Neighbourhood
| 45
| 148
| 11
| –
| Residential and retail units
| 
| 
| 
| Former City Road campus of Coleg Glan Hafren, converted in 2016 into a student accommodation and a coffee shop.
|-
| align="center" |29
| Gleider House, Phase 1 (Government Buildings), Tŷ Glas 
| 44.50
| 146
| 11
| –
| Office
| 
| 
| 
| The former HM Government offices complex in Llanishen, north Cardiff. Also see Phase 2, Government Buildings
|-
| align="center" |30
| Marriott Hotel
| 43
| 141
| 12
| 1986
| Hotel and restaurant 
| 
| 
| 
|
|-
| align="center" |31
| Channel View Flats
| 42
| 138
| 14
| 1965
| Residential
| 
| 
| 
| In Grangetown, a district of south Cardiff.
|-
| align="center" |32
|2 Central Square
|41 (approx)
|135
|10
|2018
|Office
|
|
|
|
|-
| align="center" |33
|Cardiff Castle Clock Tower
| 40
| 131
| 7
| 1873
| Monument
|
|
|
|
|}

Buildings under construction, approved for construction or proposed 
This list comprises buildings which are either under construction, approved for construction or proposed (May 2022).

{| class="wikitable"
|-
! Rank
! Name
! Height (m)
! Height (ft)
! Floors
! Approved (Year)
! Under Construction
! Image
! Use
! Source
|-
| 1
| Custom House Street Tower
| 132
| 433
| 42
| 2016
| No(construction halted)
|
| Student accommodation / retail
| 
|-
|2
|Harlech Court, Bute Terrace  
|
|
|35
|Proposed
|No
|
|Residential
|
|-
|3
|Apartment tower, 1-6 Guildford Crescent   
|96
|
|30
|2021
|No
|
|Residential
|
|-
|4
|Gramercy Tower, 6 Curran Road 
|84
|275
|27
|2020
|Yes
|
|Residential
|
|-
| 5
| Interchange Tower, 4 Central Square
| 83.5
| 274
| 22
| 2019
| Yes
|
| Bus station / residential / office
|
|-
|6
|Plot J, Capital Quarter, Tyndall Street
|75
|246
|23
|2020
|Yes
|
|Residential
|
|-
| 7
| Premier Inn Hotel  
| 61
| 200
| 18
| 2017
| Yes
|
| Hotel / restaurants 
|
|-
|8
|Vita Student Cardiff, 11 Park Place 
|55.2
|181
|18
|2018
|Yes
|
| Student accommodation 
| 
|-
| 9
| Landore Court, 47-53 Charles Street
| 50.5
| 165
| 16
| 2019
| Yes
|
| Residential
| 
|-
|10
|Plot 5 Central Square   
|95
|
|30
|Proposed
|No
|
|Residential
|
|-
|11
|Plot 01, Central Quay
|
|
|29
|2022
|No
|
|Mixed use 
| 
|-
|12
|Plot 5 Pierhead Street
|
|
|18
|Proposed
|No
|
|Student accommodation 
|
|-
|13
|John Street Tower (John Street - North) 
|99
|
|
|2018
|No
|
|Mixed use 
|
|-
|14
|Hallinans House
|99
|
|32
|2017
|No
|
|Mixed use 
|
|}

Cancelled developments
This list comprises buildings which were approved for construction but later cancelled.

{| class="wikitable"
|-
! Rank
! Name
! Height (m)
! Height (ft)
! Floors
! Proposal Date
! Use
! Source
|-
| 1
| Bay Pointe
| 122.8
| 403
| 33
| 2008
| Residential
| 
|-
| 2
| Glass Needle Scheme, also known as Heritage Gateway Scheme
| 107
| 352
| 32
| 2005
| Residential
| 
|-
| 3
| Capitol Apartments
| 75
| 246
| 25
| 2008
| Residential
| 
|-
|}

See also
 Cardiff city centre
 Architecture of Cardiff

References

External links 
SkyscraperNews: Cardiff
Cardiff Developments

Cardiff
 
Talles buildings and structures
Tallest